Ekart logistics or Ekart courier is an Indian courier delivery services company, headquartered in Bangalore, Karnataka. A subsidiary of electronic commerce company Flipkart Pvt. Ltd., it is run by Instakart services Pvt. Ltd.

Ekart delivers around 10 million shipments a month. As of 2015, Ekart shipped 85 percent of products ordered on Flipkart.

Klick2Shop Logistics Services International, a Singapore-based company, invested Rs.1641 crore in Ekart in October 2017.

Background 
Ekart was taken over by Flipkart from WS Retail Services.

Locker services in stores and supermarkets running for all hours were introduced first in the country by Ekart.

See also 
 Couriers in India
 Indian Postal Service

References

Express mail
Logistics companies of India
Indian companies established in 2009
Transport companies established in 2009
Indian brands
Flipkart
2009 establishments in Karnataka
Companies based in Bangalore